Helen MacGill Hughes (1903–1992) was a sociologist of the Chicago school and a feminist.

Personal life
Helen MacGill was born in Vancouver, British Columbia in 1903. Her mother was Helen Gregory MacGill and her father was James Henry MacGill, a lawyer in Vancouver.  She was very close to her sister, Elsie MacGill, who became an aeronautical engineer and served on the first Canadian national commission on the status of women. She graduated from the University of British Columbia, where she had studied economics and German, in 1925 and was considering graduate school in the US, when she met Professor Robert Park. He offered her a Laura Spelman Rockefeller fellowship at the University of Chicago in the Sociology Department. She lived with the Parks for a while and then, in 1927, married another Park student, Everett Cherrington Hughes.  Retrospective accounts of the work of E.C. Hughes sometimes dwell on the importance of his wife and their different career paths.  They had two daughters: Helen Hughes-Brock and Elizabeth G. R. Hughes Schneewind. The couple lived in Chicago until 1961, when they moved to Cambridge, MA, so that E. C. Hughes could join the faculty at Brandeis University; H. M. Hughes she held part-time research positions at Harvard and Brandeis.  Helen MacGill Hughes died in Baltimore, MD in 1992.

Scholarship
Hughes's doctoral dissertation, completed in 1940 under Park but while Hughes was living in Montreal, was published as News and the Human Interest Story..  While writing her dissertation, Hughes also worked with Everett Hughes on his first book,  French Canada in Transition; E.C. Hughes writes in the preface that the pair "jointly did the field work for the study."  Lewis Coser cites Arlene Kaplan Daniels as saying that beginning with that time—13 years to finish her own dissertation -- "Her career was fashioned around his."  Back in Chicago from 1938, she took five years away from work to raise her daughters, and then took on the assistant editorship of the American Journal of Sociology.  She was an editor of that journal from 1944 to 1961, and was known for her ability to ruthlessly cut out unneeded words and jargon, as well as improving others' written arguments. In print, she characterized herself and other academic wives of faculty members in terms of the sociology of work and of fictive kinship as "maid of all work or departmental sister-in-law." She frequently reflected on her own experience in a sociological vein: a related cogitation was her lecture "Women in academic sociology, 1925–75," delivered to the plenary session of the 50th annual convention of the North Central Sociological Association, Columbus, Ohio, May 4, 1975, and another was "WASP/Woman/Sociologist."

Hughes and Hughes jointly published a study of what happens when groups from different ethnic and racial backgrounds come into contact.  In the early 1950s, she worked with Howard Becker on his interviews with young drug addicts, and edited one woman's story into a book, The Fantastic Lodge: The Autobiography of a Girl Drug Addict (1961). In 1967, the American Sociological Association invited her to lead in putting together a series of seven volumes of sociological readings for secondary schools, the 1970 Reading in Sociology Series volumes on Cities and City Life, Delinquents and Criminals, Life in Families, Racial and Ethnic Relations, Social Organizations, Population Growth and the Complex Society, and Crowd and Mass Behavior.

Hughes edited six textbooks for a project on secondary education sponsored by the American Sociological Association, called "Sociological Resources for Social Studies."

In 1973, Hughes was elected Vice President of the organization Sociologists for Women in Society and in 1978 she was elected President of the Eastern Sociological Association and Vice President of the American Sociological Association.  Hughes's work has been discussed in the context of gender by Aimee-Marie Dorsten.

References

External links

1903 births
1992 deaths
Canadian women sociologists
Canadian sociologists
Canadian emigrants to the United States